Sauropus androgynus, also known as katuk, star gooseberry, or sweet leaf, is a shrub grown in some tropical regions as a leaf vegetable. 

Its multiple upright stems can reach 2.5 meters high and bear dark green oval leaves 5–6 cm long.

It is a good source of vitamin K. However, a study has suggested that excessive consumption of juiced Katuk leaves (due to its popularity for body weight control in Taiwan in the mid '90s) can cause lung damage, due to its high concentrations of the alkaloid papaverine.

It also has high level of provitamin A carotenoids, especially in freshly picked leaves, as well as high levels of vitamins B and C, protein and minerals. The more the leaves mature, the higher the nutrient content of the leaves.

It is common in evergreen forest and cultivated up to 1,300 m.

Cultural usage 
It is one of the most popular leafy vegetables in South and Southeast Asia and is notable for high yields and palatability.

Indonesia 
Interestingly, according to modern research findings on the efficacy of this herb, indicates that the extract of the Sauropus androgynus leaf increases the expression of prolactin and oxytocin genes 15 to 25 times in breastfeeding mice.

Malaysia 
In Malaysia, it is commonly stir-fried with egg or dried anchovies.

Vietnam 
In Vietnam, the shoot tips have been sold in cuisine and used similarly like the asparagus; the locals usually cook it with crab meat, minced pork or dried shrimp to make a soup.

Medical 
Consumption of Sauropus androgynus has been reported as being associated with bronchiolitis obliterans.

The leaves are safe to eat in large quantities only after being cooked as heat seems to denature the toxin.

Nutrition 

Sauropus is a good source of β-carotene α- and β-carotenes are partly metabolized into vitamin A.  It is rich in Vitamin C providing more than 100% of the Daily Value (DV) per 100 g serving of (288% DV), Iron (23% DV) and Zinc (10% DV). However, the high levels of polyphenols, such as tannin, inhibit the absorption of Zn and Fe.

Vernacular names 
 In Chinese, it is called mani cai (马尼菜)
 In Filipino, it is called Chinese malunggay
 In Indonesian, it is called 
 In Japanese, it is called amame shiba (アマメシバ)
 In Javanese, it is called  (ꦏꦛꦸꦏ꧀)
 In Tamil, it is  called Thavasi Keerai (தவசிக்கீரை)
 In Malayalam, it is called Madhura cheera ( "the Madura's spinach") or Singapura cheera ( "the Singapore's spinach")
 In Malay, it is called cekur manis (in Malaysian Malay), or asin-asin and cangkok manis (in Brunei Malay)
 In Sundanese, it is called  (ᮊᮒᮥᮾ)
 In Thai, it is called pak waan (or pak waan ban; to distinguish it from Melientha suavis, a completely different plant)
 In Vietnamese, it is called rau ngót

References

External links 

 Information from Leaf for Life
 Sweet Leaf
Katuk – Sauropus Androgynus

androgynus
Plants described in 1767
Leaf vegetables
Taxa named by Carl Linnaeus